Scopula sanguinifissa is a moth of the  family Geometridae. It is found in Madagascar.

References

Moths described in 1956
sanguinifissa
Moths of Africa